Puch bei Weiz is a municipality in the district of Weiz in the Austrian state of Styria.

Geography
Puch lies about 25 km east of Graz and 10 km east of Weiz.

References

Cities and towns in Weiz District